Delvenau (incorrectly known today as: Stecknitz) is a  river in Herzogtum Lauenburg in Schleswig-Holstein, Germany. It begins in Büchen, flows to the Elbe–Lübeck Canal near its confluence with the Elbe in Lauenburg. The lower section between Bröthen and Lauenburg forms the border between Schleswig-Holstein and Mecklenburg-Vorpommern.

The name Delvenau originates from the Middle Low German word delf meaning trench.

See also
Stecknitz
List of rivers of Schleswig-Holstein
List of rivers of Mecklenburg-Vorpommern

Rivers of Schleswig-Holstein
Rivers of Mecklenburg-Western Pomerania
Rivers of Germany